The Tel Aviv Open was not held in 1982.

Colin Dowdeswell and Zoltan Kuharszky won the title, defeating Peter Elter and Peter Feigl 6–4, 7–5 in the final.

Seeds

  Tian Viljoen /  Danie Visser (semifinals)
  Richard Meyer /  Gilles Moretton (quarterfinals, withdrew)
  Colin Dowdeswell /  Zoltán Kuhárszky (champions)
  Rodney Crowley /  Rand Evett (semifinals)

Draw

Draw

External links
Draw

Tel Aviv Open
1983 Grand Prix (tennis)